Aeronor Flight 304 was a Chilean domestic flight between the cities of Santiago and Antofagasta with two intermediate stops. On December 9, 1982, the Fairchild F-27 operating the flight crashed near La Florida Airport, in the Chilean city of La Serena. All 46 passengers and crew on board died.

Accident 
The Fairchild F-27 of Aeronor Chile was flying from Santiago to Antofagasta, with stops in La Serena and Copiapó.

The aircraft took off from Santiago at 09:40 (UTC−4), reaching the city of La Serena at 10:25. A few minutes before it was scheduled to land at La Florida Airport, the aircraft suffered a malfunction in one of its engines. After this, at 10:29, it crashed into a stone wall located in an area called "Parcela Seis" (Lot Six) at Alfalfares, located approximately 800 meters northeast of the airport terminal. After the aircraft crashed, it caught fire and was almost completely burnt. It is estimated that the aircraft crashed at a speed of 180 km/h. All forty-two passengers and four crew members were killed by the crash or subsequent fire.

Initially, the accident was mistaken for an emergency drill at the airport in La Serena which had commenced a few hours before the tragedy. A television crew from Canal 8 UCV TV, who were shooting scenes of the drill, managed to capture the Aeronor aircraft on fire shortly after the crash.

Notable victims 
Silvia Pinto, a well known news reporter.

References

External links 
 

Aviation accidents and incidents in 1982
Aviation accidents and incidents in Chile
Accidents and incidents involving the Fairchild F-27
Aeronor Chile accidents and incidents
December 1982 events in South America
1982 in Chile
Airliner accidents and incidents caused by engine failure
1982 disasters in Chile